A by-election was held for the New South Wales Legislative Assembly electorate of Murrumbidgee on 30 March 1893 because of the resignation of the Premier Sir George Dibbs due to insolvency. Sir George had twice been made bankrupt 10 and 15 years previously. He attributed his bankruptcy to depreciation in the value of his freehold and mining property.

Dates

Result

The by-election was caused by the resignation of Sir George Dibbs due to bankruptcy.

See also
Electoral results for the district of Murrumbidgee
List of New South Wales state by-elections

References

1893 elections in Australia
New South Wales state by-elections
1890s in New South Wales